Dimethylone (βk-MDDMA) is a substituted cathinone derivative with stimulant and empathogenic effects. Unlike the corresponding amphetamine derivative MDDM which is thought to be practically inactive, dimethylone substitutes for methamphetamine and MDMA in animal studies and has been sold as a designer drug.

Legality 
In the United States Dimethylone is considered a schedule 1 controlled substance as a positional isomer of Butylone

See also 
 Dimethylcathinone
 Dibutylone
 Dipentylone
 Methylone
 Ethylone
 Butylone
 Eutylone
 Ephylone
 5-Methylethylone
 MDPPP

References 

Designer drugs
Serotonin-norepinephrine-dopamine releasing agents